Big Brother 2 is the second season of the Belgian version of Big Brother aired in the Flemish Region of Belgium on Kanaal 2. The show started on 2 September 2001 and finished on 16 December 2001 with a total duration of 106 days. 

Changes for this season making it harder to live for housemates: add an isolation cell, lower the budget of the group and add the opening twist (eleven male housemates and only one female housemate on opening night, but changed at the end of the week by having six male and five female housemates). Those measures impacted the group dynamic in many ways. An exception was made about the news of the outside world, when producers decided to inform the housemates about 911 since a family member of one of the housemates was involved.

The season was known for many conflicts and some parties that got out of hand, which led to much criticism. One of the positive highlights was the task for charity. The housemates collected more than 7 million Belgium francs (BEF) in one week.

Ellen Dufour was the winner and won 5 million BEF. The ratings of the highlights shows and the highlights compilation shows dropped. But still, Big Brother was successful, having the live shows often with more than 1 million viewers. The finale was the eighth highest-rated show in 2001 in Flanders and was watched by 1.1 million viewers. Pay television CanalDigitaal which offered a 24 hours live stream had more subscribers because of Big Brother.

Format
This season had the same Back to Basics format as the first season. The tag line of the season was "Bigger, harder and better". The season was indeed harder to live since there were some changes that made staying in the house a lot more difficult for the housemates: 
 The daily budget was only 100BEF (decreased from 150BEF).
 The group could only receive 50 or 100% wage for the weekly task (in comparison with 25, 50, 75 and 100% in the first season).
 The luxury products like alcohol, cigarettes and shampoo increased by 75%.
 An isolation cell was built for housemates who not following the rules. The cell was only 4m².

Another difference was the nomination system
 Three housemates (instead of two in the first season) with the most nominations were nominated.
 A "floche" was added. After the announcement of the nominated housemates, one of them could pull down the "floche". This housemate would have been saved from eviction but the group would lose its weekly budget.
 The public could vote during the live show to rescue one of the nominated housemates.
 The remaining nominated housemates faced the public vote for eviction.

Housemates

Weekly summary

Nominations table

Notes

External links
 World of Big Brother

References

02
2001 television seasons